The VR Class Ds1 Also known as "Puumotti" (Roughly translated to Wood Cubic meter "motti" being a means to measure wood volume) was the first railbus of the Finnish State Railways. It was ordered in 1927. The Ds1 was built by the Pasila workshop, but the automotive parts including the engine were supplied by the Swedish company DEVA. Ds1 has a diesel engine and an electric drive, with a diesel generator providing power to the wheels. A cab is at either end of the vehicle, so that the vehicle did not have to be turned at terminal stations. The vehicle consisted of a motor room, a luggage compartment, and a 3rd class passenger compartment bare on a wooden bench seating.

The Finnish State Railways started ordering Diesel multiple units and railcars, as road transport began to compete with rail passenger services. To compete with car and bus services the state railway added a number of train services and intermediate halts to its network. The use of steam locomotives on quiet railway lines would have been inappropriate, and the associated costs would have been too high.

The last Ds1 was withdrawn in 1955, the same year as the first VR Class Dm7 was completed.

Numbering and Duration of Operation

See also
 Finnish Railway Museum
 VR Group
 List of Finnish locomotives
 List of railway museums Worldwide
 Heritage railways
 List of heritage railways
 Restored trains
 Jokioinen Museum Railway
 History of rail transport in Finland

External links
Finnish Railway Museum
Steam Locomotives in Finland Including the Finnish Railway Museum

Gallery

References

Multiple units of Finland